Long Banio (also known as Long Banyo, Long Banto or Long Banci) is a large longhouse village in the Marudi division of Sarawak, Malaysia.

The village people are Ngurik Kenyahs.

Neighbouring settlements include:

References

Villages in Sarawak